Frederick Douglass High School (FDHS), first established in 1923 as Marlboro "Colored" High School and renamed Frederick Douglass High School in 1935, is a public high school located in the Croom census-designated place of unincorporated Prince George's County, Maryland, United States, with a mailing address of Upper Marlboro and near Upper Marlboro. Douglass is a part of the Prince George's County Public Schools system and is named after the famous abolitionist, journalist, and orator, Frederick Douglass.

The current principal is Mr. Eddie Scott. The July 2019 student enrollment was approximately 1,050-students in grades nine through twelve. The school hours are from 7:45am until 2:25pm. There is a mandatory uniform policy in effect at Douglass. The school features an International Baccalaureate (IB) Middle Years Programme (MYP) a P-TECH program as well as a school-wide America's Choice School Design signature program.

History
What was then Marlboro (Colored) High School opened in September 1923, in a four-room building previously designated for white high school students in Upper Marlboro. It was the first high school for African-Americans in Prince George's County and was funded by a fundraising effort by PGCPS Supervisor of Negro Schools Doswell E. Brooks, which began in 1922. Prior to the establishment of Marlboro, black students in Prince George's County attended high school in Baltimore or Washington, DC.

The land was donated by Sheldon Sasscer. The former white high school building was moved onto Sasscer's land so it could be used as the new school for black children. During the era of legal racial segregation in schools, white students in the Upper Marlboro area attended Marlboro High School, which opened in 1921.

In 1935 a new building serving elementary through high school opened, and the school was given its current name. The present Frederick Douglass High School opened in 1959. The former building was converted into offices.

In the period 1950 to 1964, Douglass served about 33% of PGCPS black high school students; the remainder attended Fairmont Heights High School, then near Fairmount Heights, which opened in 1950. Circa 1964 PGCPS ended legalized racial segregation of schools. When the late 1960s came, Douglass was a majority white high school because a lot of the black high school students were reassigned to schools closer to their houses. By 2000 Douglass returned to being majority black.

In the early 1980s the former Douglass High was razed. A commemorative plaque was installed at the site in September 2000 by the Frederick Douglass High School Class of 1950.

Campus
The school was previously defined by the U.S. Census Bureau as being in the Greater Upper Marlboro CDP.

Around 2016 the official capacity of Douglass was over 1,400 students, but it previously had an official capacity of 1,283. The PGCPS operations officer, Monica Goldson, stated that the Douglass principal reviewed the new number and that the district took into account the total classroom space. Board member Sonya Williams advocated for the former capacity and feared that the school district could use the new capacity to officially state the school was under-enrolled and close it at a later time.

In 2015 the school received a new tennis court and rubberized field; the upgrades to its athletic facilities totaled $317,270.

The media center is named after former principal Robert F. Frisby, who had the nickname "Baldy".

Student body
In the pre-1964 segregation era many of the students previously attended rural one and two schoolhouses and lived in rural residences with no electricity, telephone, and/or water services.

Pre-1964 many students who graduated from Douglass matriculated to Bowie State University (previously Maryland Normal and Industrial School at Bowie, Maryland Teachers College at Bowie, and Bowie State College) and University of Maryland Eastern Shore (then known as Maryland State College), as well as Hampton University (formerly Hampton Agricultural and Industrial School, and later Hampton Institute).

Athletics
Pre-1964 Douglass entered in athletic competitions with Cardozo Education Campus (formerly Cardozo High School) in Washington, Carver High School in Rockville, Bel Alton High School in Charles County, and schools in Baltimore.

Communities served
The school serves: sections of the Croom and Rosaryville CDPs, and all of the Marlton CDP.

Notable people
Karen Handel, U.S. Representative and former Georgia Secretary of State, 2007-2010
Shawne Merriman, former American football linebacker in the National Football League, 2005-2012

References

External links
Frederick Douglass HS Official Website
Frederick Douglass HS Facts & Figures

Public high schools in Maryland
Schools in Prince George's County, Maryland
Educational institutions established in 1934
1934 establishments in Maryland